Montenegro competed at the 2020 Summer Olympics in Tokyo. Originally scheduled to take place from 24 July to 9 August 2020, the Games were postponed to 23 July to 8 August 2021, because of the COVID-19 pandemic. It was the nation's fourth consecutive appearance at the Summer Olympics since gaining independence in 2006.

Competitors
The following is the list of number of competitors in the Games. Note that reserves in handball are not counted:

Athletics

Montenegrin athletes further achieved the entry standards, either by qualifying time or by world ranking, in the following track and field events (up to a maximum of 3 athletes in each event):

Field events

Handball

Summary

Women's tournament

Montenegro women's national handball team qualified for the Olympics by securing a top-two finish at the Podgorica leg of the 2020 IHF Olympic Qualification Tournament.

Team roster

Group play

Quarterfinal

Judo

Sailing

Montenegro received an invitation from the Tripartite Commission to send a sailor in the Laser class to the Enoshima regatta.

M = Medal race; EL = Eliminated – did not advance into the medal race

Shooting

Montenegro received an invitation from ISSF to send a female air pistol shooter to the Olympics, based on her minimum qualifying score (MQS) attained on or before June 5, 2021.

Swimming

Montenegro received a universality invitation from FINA to send two top-ranked swimmers (one per gender) in their respective individual events to the Olympics, based on the FINA Points System of June 28, 2021.

Water polo

Summary

Men's tournament

Montenegro men's national water polo team qualified for the Olympics by advancing to the final match of the 2020 World Qualification Tournament in Rotterdam, Netherlands.

Team roster

Group play

Quarterfinal

5–8th place semifinal

Seventh place game

References

External links 

Nations at the 2020 Summer Olympics
2020
2021 in Montenegrin sport